Brooklyn is a suburb in Melbourne, Victoria, Australia,  west of Melbourne's Central Business District, located within the Cities of Brimbank and Hobsons Bay local government areas. Brooklyn recorded a population of 1,979 at the 2021 census.

Demographics

According to the  the population of Brooklyn is 1,856, approximately 47.6% females and 52.4% males.

The median/average age of the people in Brooklyn is 33 years.

56.2% of people living in the suburb of Brooklyn were born in Australia. The other top responses for country of birth were 4.1% Vietnam, 3.3% Italy, 2.8% China, 3.6% New Zealand, 2.3% and 2.4% India.

55% of people living in Brooklyn speak English only. The other top languages spoken are 5.1% Vietnamese, 4.3% Italian, 3.6% Cantonese, 2.7% Mandarin and 2.4% Arabic.

Religious affiliations in Brooklyn are 30.9% no religion, 24.9% Catholic, 7.3% Islam, 4.6% Eastern Orthodox.

Transport
 Route 232: Altona North – City (Queen Victoria Market)
 Route 411: Laverton Station – Footscray (via Altona Meadows and Altona)
 Route 412: Laverton Station – Footscray (via Altona Meadows and Altona)
 Route 414: Laverton Station – Footscray
 Route 903: Altona – Mordialloc (SMARTBUS service)

Industry

Brooklyn is largely an industrial suburb, with a small pocket of low-density residential in the south. The industrial area features a landfill and recycling centre, offices for numerous logistics organisations, including CEVA Logistics, and distribution centres for HAG Import Corporation and Novo Shoes, as well as car dealerships, wreckers and auction centres.

The former Huntsman (chemical plant) in Somerville Road is located in Brooklyn and is now heritage listed.

The Newport – Sunshine freight railway line also runs through the suburb.

The company featured in the mockumentary Kenny (2006), Splashdown, is located in Brooklyn.

Other features

The Federation Trail is a shared use path for cyclists and pedestrians, which starts in Brooklyn on Millers Road.

Other parks and reserves in the area include D.N. Duane Reserve, Rowan Avenue Reserve, Kororoit Creek Reserve and Brooklyn Reserve, the latter of which features a playground, dog park and barbecue area.

Other amenities in the residential part of Brooklyn include a Community Centre and Tennis Courts on Cypress Avenue, as well as small shopping strips on Geelong Road and Eames Avenue.

There are also multiple adult entertainment venues operating in Brooklyn, including Club 741 located on Geelong Road.

See also
 City of Sunshine – Brooklyn was previously within this former local government area.
 Kororoit Creek

References

External links
Hobsons Bay Community Online Forum

Suburbs of Melbourne
Suburbs of the City of Hobsons Bay
Suburbs of the City of Brimbank